The 1953 New York Giants season was the franchise's 71st season. The team finished in fifth place in the National League with a 70–84 record, 35 games behind the Brooklyn Dodgers.

Offseason
 Prior to 1953 season: Marshall Bridges was signed as an amateur free agent by the Giants.
 After 1953 season: The Giants embarked of a month-long exhibition tour to Hawaii, Japan, Manila, Okinawa, and Guam. This marked the first time a Major League Baseball team to play Japanese teams. The Giants went 12-1-1 during their tour in Japan, including beating the 1953 Japan Series champions, the Tokyo Giants, 11-1.

Regular season

Season standings

Record vs. opponents

Opening Day lineup

Notable transactions 
 July 1, 1953: Marv Grissom was selected off waivers by the Giants from the Boston Red Sox.

Roster

Player stats

Batting

Starters by position 
Note: Pos = Position; G = Games played; AB = At bats; H = Hits; Avg. = Batting average; HR = Home runs; RBI = Runs batted in

Other batters 
Note: G = Games played; AB = At bats; H = Hits; Avg. = Batting average; HR = Home runs; RBI = Runs batted in

Pitching

Starting pitchers 
Note: G = Games pitched; IP = Innings pitched; W = Wins; L = Losses; ERA = Earned run average; SO = Strikeouts

Other pitchers 
Note: G = Games pitched; IP = Innings pitched; W = Wins; L = Losses; ERA = Earned run average; SO = Strikeouts

Relief pitchers 
Note: G = Games pitched; W = Wins; L = Losses; SV = Saves; ERA = Earned run average; SO = Strikeouts

Farm system 

LEAGUE CHAMPIONS: Sioux City, Danville

Notes

References 
 1953 New York Giants at Baseball Reference
 1953 New York Giants at Baseball Almanac

New York Giants (NL)
San Francisco Giants seasons
New York Giants season
New York Giants (MLB)
1950s in Manhattan
Washington Heights, Manhattan